Castenaso is a town and comune in the Metropolitan City of Bologna, Emilia-Romagna, Italy.

Sports

Associazione Sportiva Dilettantistica Castenaso Villanova is the main association football club based in the city.

References

Sources
Official website

Cities and towns in Emilia-Romagna